Nuno Frazão (born 25 December 1971) is a Portuguese fencer. He competed in the individual épée event at the 1996 Summer Olympics.

References

External links
 

1971 births
Living people
Portuguese male épée fencers
Olympic fencers of Portugal
Fencers at the 1996 Summer Olympics
Sportspeople from Lisbon